Jacob Vredeman de Vries (or Jacques) (Mechelen, circa 1563/1564 - Leeuwarden, September 1621) was a kapellmeister and composer of music in Leeuwarden. Jacques Vredeman published 12 villanelles in the West Frisian language.

Life
He was a son of Hans Vredeman de Vries, originally from Leeuwarden, and a brother of Paul, and Salomon. Vredeman received his musical education in Mechelen but moved to the north around 1588, after many cities in the Southern Netherlands were occupied by Alexander Farnese.

Work
Only two publications by his hand survived:

The book "Musica miscella o mescolanze di madrigali, canzoni, e villanelli in lingua Frisica a quatro & cinque voci" was published in Franeker by Gilli van den Rade, who was one of the major Calvinistic publishers of Antwerp; he also worked as a legal printer in Friesland. The Frisian villanelles deal with the farmer’s life in a mildly comical way. Back when they were composed, the West Frisian language wasn’t considered as a language suitable for serious songs yet. Only with Gysbert Japix did this appreciation come into existence, and was the language seen as suitable for subjects such as serious love poetry, political chants, and psalms.

Vredemans’ "Isagoge musicae, dat is corte, perfecte instructie van de principale musycke" was published in 1618.

References 

 Jan Willem Bonda, De meerstemmige Nederlandse liederen van de vijftiende en zestiende eeuw. Hilversum, Verloren, 1996. 
 Notes in the booklet of the CD Gysbert Japix, Lieten/Liederen, by Camerata Trajectina, conducted by Louis Peter Grijp, Globe, 2003

External links 
 Jacob Vredeman de Vries at ChoralWiki
 Jacob Vredeman de Vries at IMSLP

1580s births
1621 deaths
17th-century classical composers
Dutch composers
Flemish composers
Musicians from Mechelen
West Frisian-language writers